Andrew Ondrejcak is an American artist working in theater and film. He writes, directs, and designs his original performances that have been produced in the U.S. and internationally. His design work crosses into the fashion industry and has been featured in Vogue, W, and Wallpaper, among others.

Life 
Ondrejcak was born and raised in Hattiesburg, Mississippi and studied architecture and painting at the Savannah College of Art and Design, then Playwriting at Brooklyn College, where he studied under playwright Mac Wellman and performance artist Vito Acconci. Ondrejcak reperformed the work of Marina Abramovic at MoMA in 2010 in her retrospective, The Artist Is Present. He has taught design and theatre workshops at Domaine de Boisbuchet in Lessac, France and, from 2003 - 2013, was a freelance lecturer at the Museum of Modern Art.

Performance 
Ondrejcak's performance works bring together theater, dance and music and include performers from a variety of artistic backgrounds, ages and nationalities. His films link art historical objects and classical forms with contemporary iconography, often putting a queer perspective on a classical form.

Works include Veneration #1: The Young Heir Takes Possession of The Master's Effects (2010) commissioned by Robert Wilson for the Guggenheim Works and Process; the play FEAST (2014) premiered at Under the Radar Festival at the Public Theater in New York, featuring Reg E. Cathey; the opera YOU US WE ALL (2015) with composer Shara Worden at the Brooklyn Academy of Music. Also at BAM, Ondrejcak created an installation for Crossing Brooklyn Ferry, an art festival curated by Bryce Dessner.

Ondrejcak worked with the "Ethical Fashion Initiative" on the costumes for series of his performances including Landscape with Figures  at Contemporary Art Center, New Orleans, Figure Studies, at the Beaux Arts Museum (Brussels), Elijah Green at The Kitchen (New York City), and The Future Is Now and I am It: A Parade to Mark the Moment, the opening event of REACH at The Kennedy Center, curated by multi-disciplinary visual and performance artist Carrie Mae Weems.

Ondrejcak's short films include The Actress with Isabel Sandoval, The Story and The Writer, featuring Tilda Swinton; The Sword of Damocles, which stars Darren Criss and Rufus Wainwright; and Signed, Sealed, Delivered I'm Yours, a Stevie Wonder Tribute which in one version highlights James Franco and in another Rufus Wainwright.

He has been an Artist in Residence at the Park Avenue Armory,The Watermill Center, NYC's Governor's Island, Baryshnikov Arts Center, Yaddo, Josef and Anni Albers Foundation’s Thread in Senegal, and the MacDowell Colony.

References

External links 
andrewondrejcak.com
arktype.org/andrewondrejcak
lalaland-artists.com/artists/andrewondrejcak
Andrew Ondrejcak's Under Construction show on the American Theatre Wing's "Working in the Theatre" series.

American designers
21st-century American dramatists and playwrights
Year of birth missing (living people)
Living people
Writers from Mississippi
Brooklyn College alumni
Savannah College of Art and Design alumni